Penfield is a surname.  Notable people with the name include:

Add Penfield (Addison Pierce Penfield, 1918–2010), North Carolina sports radio broadcaster
Daniel Penfield (1759–1840), founder of Penfield, New York
Edward Penfield (1866–1925), American illustrator and poster artist
Frederic Courtland Penfield (1855–1922), American diplomat
Samuel Penfield Taylor (1827—1886), American entrepreneur
Smith Newell Penfield (1837–1920), American composer
Thomas Penfield Jackson (1937–2013), US District Court Judge
Wilder Penfield (1891–1976), Canadian neurosurgeon